Gabriel Gómez Román (born 3 September 1985 in Barcelona, Catalonia), commonly known as Gabri, is a Spanish professional footballer who plays for SD Portmany as a forward.

External links

1985 births
Living people
Spanish footballers
Footballers from Barcelona
Association football forwards
Segunda División players
Segunda División B players
Tercera División players
Tercera Federación players
Deportivo Alavés B players
Haro Deportivo players
Deportivo Alavés players
CA Osasuna B players
Girona FC players
RCD Espanyol B footballers
CD San Roque de Lepe footballers
SD Eibar footballers
CF Badalona players
UE Sant Andreu footballers
Burgos CF footballers
SD Leioa players
SD Formentera players
SD Logroñés players
Primera Divisió players
FC Ordino players
Spanish expatriate footballers
Expatriate footballers in Andorra
Spanish expatriate sportspeople in Andorra